The Big 12 men's basketball tournament (known since its inception in 1997 under sponsorship agreements as the Phillips 66 Big 12 men's basketball tournament) is the championship men's basketball tournament in the Big 12 Conference. It is a single-elimination tournament of four rounds, with the top six seeds getting byes in the first round. Seeding is based on regular season records.
The winner of the tournament receives the Big 12 Conference automatic bid to the NCAA Championship tournament.

Between 2005 and 2019, no current Big 12 member besides Iowa State or Kansas won the tournament, and those two schools have won 17 of 25 titles. The remaining current Big 12 schools only account for six additional tournament titles. For its first twenty-three years, no school from outside the original Big Eight Conference had ever won the tournament. This streak ended when the Texas Longhorns won the championship game against Oklahoma State in 2021.

The tournament is set to be held at the T-Mobile Center (formerly Sprint Center) in Kansas City, Missouri until 2027.

History

The tournament has been held every year since the first full basketball season was completed in 1997. (The Big 12 was formed in 1996)  Since that time, it was held in Kemper Arena in Kansas City, Missouri in early March for every year up until 2003, and also in 2005. In 2003, 2004, and 2006 it was held at the American Airlines Center in Dallas, Texas, and in 2007 it was held in the Ford Center at Oklahoma City, Oklahoma. In 2008 it was again held in Kansas City, but this time at the Sprint Center.

The 2009 edition of the championship was held in Oklahoma City, with the event returning to Kansas City from 2010 through 2020. On October 24, 2018, it was announced that the Big 12 Tournament would stay in Kansas City through 2024, and on June 12, 2020, it was announced that it would stay in Kansas City through 2025. Kansas has won the most Big 12 postseason titles as well, winning 11 out of 24, while appearing in 14 championship games.

Tournament champions

Numbers in parentheses refer to each team's finish/seed in the tournament for that year. Teams are seeded in order of highest conference record. Tie-breakers are based on conference record starting with:
 Head-to-head
 Record against highest standing team in conference, continuing down until one team gains an advantage
 Conference road games
 Road record against highest standing team, continuing down
 Draw, starting with highest seed to be determined
 Ties among more than two teams are broken similarly by comparing the "mini round-robin" record among tied teams, reverting to the above when elimination narrows it to two tied teams

Results by team

Tournament record

Championship game record

See also

Big Eight Conference men's basketball tournament
Southwest Conference men's basketball tournament
Big 12 women's basketball tournament
List of Big 12 men's basketball tournament finals broadcasters

References

 
Recurring sporting events established in 1997
College sports tournaments in Missouri